Camberwell Girls Grammar School is an independent Anglican early learning, primary and secondary day school for girls located in Canterbury, an eastern suburb of Melbourne, Victoria, Australia. Founded in 1920 in the hall of St Mark's Church in Camberwell, the school welcomes students of all cultures and currently caters for 820 students from Early learning to Year 12.

The school is a member of the Association of Heads of Independent Schools of Australia (AHISA), the Junior School Heads Association of Australia (JSHAA), the Alliance of Girls' Schools Australasia (AGSA), the Association of Independent Schools of Victoria (AISV), and is a founding member of Girls Sport Victoria (GSV).

History
Camberwell Girls Grammar School was founded in February 1921. Charged by the Archbishop of Melbourne, Henry Lowther Clarke, the parishioners of St Mark's Church in Camberwell embarked on a significant project. Led by their vicar, Hubert Brooksbank, they established St Mark's Parish School.

With just $1,000, Brooksbank built a brick hall for the school to operate from. Opening with eight pupils, both boys and girls, the school flourished and by 1925 there were 70 students and by 1926 the school had outgrown its home.

In late 1926, the school council purchased "Torrington", a nearby home, for $7,500. With frontage to both Torrington and Woodstock streets, the property was in an ideal position. The grounds and the main building had potential to be a school.

Over the 1926 Christmas holidays, the council members and families worked on the "Torrington" property and in February 1927 the school moved to its new home.

In November 1964, Ormiston Girls' School, the oldest girls' school on the Australian mainland and the oldest in Victoria, accepted the offer to merge with Camberwell Girls Grammar School. The following year, the two schools came together as one.

In October of 2019, the prestigious Camberwell Girls School was sued by a former student from the class of 2016.

Ormiston
The school's junior school, Ormiston, was established in 1849 and is the oldest girls' school on Australian mainland and the oldest in Victoria. The history of Ormiston is one of private enterprise by pioneer women, mostly young women, who spent years of their lives in service of the infant state educating girls of the time. They enjoyed no financial assistance from church or public funds.

At 166 years of age, Ormiston has only had a few sites. For 52 years it operated out of buildings in East Melbourne before moving to Mont Albert in 1901. In 1964, Ormiston accepted the offer to merge with Camberwell Girls Grammar School. The following year, the two schools officially become one with the junior students working from the St John’s Avenue Campus (Ormiston) and the senior students at the Torrington Street campus. In 2007, the two schools were formally united as one with the opening of the junior school on Mont Albert Road.

House system
The school population is divided into four houses. The school house system builds spirit and maintains tradition. Being part of a house ensures that girls are connected across year levels.
Lawrence House (Red)Received its name from George D. Lawrence, a lawyer who was a member of the founding council of the school and remained very active in the council for 20 years.
Schofield House (Yellow)Received its name from James Schofield, chairman of the school council from 1921. His daughters were among the first students at the school.
Taylor House (Green)Received its name from Louisa Taylor, the first headmistress of the school. She was headmistress from 1928 to 1959.
Singleton House (Blue)Was established in 1965 when Ormiston became part of Camberwell Girls Grammar School. Received its name from the Singleton sisters former, headmistresses of Ormiston.

The girls participate in many house competitions such as House athletics, swimming, cross country, diving, drama, dance, theatre sports, debating and music.

Principals

Sport 
Camberwell Girls Grammar is a member of Girls Sport Victoria (GSV).

GSV premierships 
Camberwell Girls Grammar has won the following GSV premierships.

 Basketball (3) - 2009, 2011, 2012
 Indoor Cricket (2) - 2011, 2013

Notable alumnae
Alumnae of Camberwell Girls Grammar School are known as "Old Grammarians" or "Old Girls" and may elect to join the school's alumni association, the Old Grammarians' Association (OGA). Some notable old grammarians include:
 Joan ChildAO first female Speaker of the Australian House of Representatives
 Vika and Linda Bull - Award winning Australian vocal duo. 
 Rebecca Spindler - Zoologist and international conservation scientist.

See also

 List of schools in Victoria
 List of high schools in Melbourne
 List of Anglican schools in Australia

References

External links
 Camberwell Girls Grammar School’s website

Girls' schools in Victoria (Australia)
Educational institutions established in 1920
Anglican secondary schools in Melbourne
1920 establishments in Australia
Anglican primary schools in Melbourne
Junior School Heads Association of Australia Member Schools
Alliance of Girls' Schools Australasia
Buildings and structures in the City of Boroondara